The Welner table is a medical examination table designed to facilitate accessibility for both patients and doctors with physical disabilities. It was designed by American obstetrician-gynecologist and disability rights activist Sandra Welner.

The table also serves the needs of disabled physicians by allowing a wider range of positions for performing examinations.

References

Further reading

External links
Welner Enabled - manufacturer of Welner tables

Medical equipment
Assistive technology